Henrique of Kongo may refer to:

Henrique of Kongo (bishop) (1495–1531)
Henrique I of Kongo, king
Henrique II of Kongo, king
Henrique III of Kongo, king